Traitor is a 1982 fantasy role-playing game adventure for Thieves' World, published by FASA.

Contents
Traitor is FASA's first approved adventure for Thieves' World.

Reception
William A. Barton reviewed Traitor in The Space Gamer No. 55. Barton commented that "Overall, Traitor is an excellent offering that should provide plenty of excitement in Sanctuary.  And even those TW enthusiasts who don't want to run or play the adventure itself should find the bonus essay from Robert Aspirin himself on gaming Jubal plus the new background info on Sanctuary well worth shelling out the price of the book."

Oliver Dickinson reviewed Traitor for White Dwarf #38, giving it an overall rating of 7 out of 10, and stated that "all in all, these look like testing and enjoyable adventures."

Reviews
Different Worlds #33 (March/April, 1984)

References

Fantasy role-playing game adventures
Role-playing game supplements introduced in 1982
Thieves' World